Humberto Fernández-Morán Villalobos (February 18, 1924 March 17, 1999) was a Venezuelan research scientist born in Maracaibo, Venezuela, known for inventing the diamond knife or scalpel, significantly advancing the development of electromagnetic lenses for electron microscopy based on superconducting technology, and many other scientific contributions.

Career
Fernández-Morán founded the Venezuelan Institute for Neurological and Brain Studies, the predecessor of the current Venezuelan Institute of Scientific Research (IVIC). He studied medicine at the University of Munich, where he graduated summa cum laude in 1944. He contributed to the development of the electron microscope and was the first person to use the concept of cryo-ultramicrotomy. After flying over Angel Falls in his home country of Venezuela he was inspired by the concept of the smoothly reoccurring flow system inherent in a waterfall to take his diamond knife invention and combine it with an ultramicrotome to dramatically improve the ultra-thin sectioning of electron microscopy samples. The ultramictrotome advances the rotating, drum-mounted specimen sample in such small increments (utilizing the very low thermal expansion coefficient of Invar) past the stationary diamond knife that sectioning thicknesses of several Angstrom units are possible.  He also helped to advance the field of electron cryomicroscopy - the use of superconductive electromagnetic lenses cooled with liquid helium in electron microscopes to achieve the highest resolution possible - among many other research topics.

Fernández-Morán was commissioned in 1957 with the supervision of the first Venezuelan research nuclear reactor, the RV-1 nuclear reactor, one of the first in Latin America.

He was appointed Minister of Science during the last year of the regime of Marcos Pérez Jiménez and was forced to leave Venezuela when the dictatorship was overthrown in 1958. He worked with NASA for the Apollo Project and taught in many universities, such as MIT, University of Chicago and the University of Stockholm.

He donated a collection of his papers to the National Library of Medicine in 1986.

Personal life
His wife Anna was Swedish and together they had two daughters, Brigida Elena and Verónica.

The body of Dr. Humberto Fernández-Morán Villalobos was cremated and his ashes rest today in Cemetery The Square Luxburg-Carolath in his hometown, Maracaibo.

Inventions
Diamond knife
Ultra microtome

Awards and honors
 1967, the John Scott Award, for his invention of the diamond scalpel.
 Knight of the Order of the Polar Star
 Claude Bernard Medal, University of Montreal
 Cambridge annual Medical Prize

See also 
 
List of Venezuelans

References

External links
The Patent of the Diamond Scalpel - September 1955.
Research done for NASA by Fernández Morán

1924 births
1999 deaths
People from Maracaibo
Venezuelan inventors
Venezuelan scientists
Microscopists
Academic staff of the Central University of Venezuela
Knights of the Order of the Polar Star
20th-century inventors
Venezuelan emigrants to Sweden
Education ministers of Venezuela